Clarias anguillaris is a species of African airbreathing catfish also known as the mudfish.  This species is of minor importance in commercial fisheries.  It grows to a length of 100 cm (39.4 inches) TL.

External links
 

Clarias
Fish of Africa
Fish described in 1758
Taxa named by Carl Linnaeus